The Kadalundi train disaster occurred on 22 June 2001, when the Mangalore-Chennai Mail passenger train was crossing over the Kadalundi river. Three carriages fell into the water, with 59 people reported killed or missing, and up to 300 believed injured. The official inquiry concluded that the accident was caused by one pillar of the 140-year old bridge sinking into the riverbed, following recent heavy rain, though this finding has been challenged.

Event
The Mangalore-Chennai Mail passenger train heading for Chennai was crossing Bridge 924 over the Kadalundi river, connecting Malappuram and Kozhikode districts when six carriages derailed and three fell into the river.

The death toll for the accident rose steadily as bodies were retrieved from the wreckage over the course of a week, but a figure of 59 people was eventually reported as killed or missing, including at least eight women and two children, whilst between 117 and 300 were injured and transported to nearby hospitals. These figures were still challenged by some, who said the toll was higher and that a number of people were still missing. It was one of India’s biggest rail accidents in 2001.

The monsoon rains had been normal that year. Officials stated that heavy rainfall in the 24 hours before the accident could have contributed to the problems on the bridge. The bridge failed as the heavy train passed over them. The bridge was 140 years old and in a poor state of repair, and it shifted when the line broke, derailing six cars of the train. Three carriages fell into the swollen river.

Rescue parties, totalling over 500 people from nearby towns, entered the river to rescue people from the wrecked carriages, and support was also received from fire brigades and the Indian Navy, who sent fifty professional divers to attempt to rescue those trapped in the underwater railway cars. Railway officials and family members also arrived rapidly with the aid of a special train.

Inquiry
The inquiry into what actually caused the damage to the bridge was highly controversial, because government investigators concluded that one of the bridge's pillars had sunk into the river, causing an uneven kink in the track, which snapped when the train hit it. Subsequent private investigations have seriously questioned this theory, pointing out that the bridge is damaged on top of the structure in a way which would not be possible if the pillar was unstable. These investigators claim that there was a fault with the train itself or it can be both together, for most of accidents happen due to more than one cause.

Similar accidents
 - Tangiwai disaster - lahar undermines bridge.
 - Veligonda train disaster
 - Perumon train disaster

References

External links

Derailments in India
Railway accidents and incidents in Kerala
Railway accidents in 2001
Bridge disasters in India
2001 disasters in India
Bridge disasters caused by maintenance error
Bridge disasters caused by scour damage
Transport in Malappuram district
History of Kerala (1947–present)
Rail transport in Kerala
History of Malappuram district
Disasters in Kerala